The Conventus Lucensis (conventus iuridicus of Lucus Augusti), was a Roman administrative unit located in the northwest of the Iberian Peninsula, in Gallaecia. Its name derives from its capital Lucus Augusti (ancient Lugo), the most important city in this convent, economical and administrative center of the country. Its Southern borders were marked by the river Verdugo, and the river Sil (limit with the Conventus bracarensis, in the north the coastline from Morrazo until river Navia (current Asturias), in the East the Ancares' mountains and the Conventus asturicensis.

References
Celtic culture: a historical encyclopedia, John Thomas Koch, 2006.
Priscillian of Avila: the occult and the charismatic in the early church, Henry Chadwick, 1976.

Ancient Roman geography
Gallaecia